Selište is a village in the City of Mostar, Bosnia and Herzegovina.

Demographics
According to the 2013 census, its population was 172, all Croats.

References

Populated places in Mostar
Villages in the Federation of Bosnia and Herzegovina